Beyond the Black Hole is a Man or Astro-man? compilation featuring tracks that originally appeared on 7-inch EPs. It was released in 2001 on Estrus Records. This release features many of the same songs that were featured on the 1997 Australia-only release What Remains Inside a Black Hole.

Track listing
"The Wayward Meteor" – 2:56
"Rovers" – 2:11
"The Quatermass Phenomena" – 2:57
"Polaris" – 3:23
"The Vortex Beyond" – 2:21
"24 Hrs. - 2:23
"Surf Terror" – 2:55
"The Powerful Transistorized Dick Tracy Two-Way Wrist Radio" – 1:46
"Reverb 1000" – 2:08
"Transmissions from Venus" – 2:39
"Green-Blooded Love" – 1:15
"Within a Martian Heart" – 1:43

References

Man or Astro-man? albums
2001 compilation albums